Australia competed at the 2022 Commonwealth Games held in Birmingham, England. It was Australia's 22nd appearance at the Commonwealth Games, having competed at every Games since their inception in 1930.

Olympic medallist in field hockey Eddie Ockenden and former squash world champion Rachael Grinham were the country's flagbearers during the Opening Ceremony. Five-time Commonwealth Games medalist Melissa Wu was the flagbearer at the Closing Ceremony after her gold medal in the Women’s 10m Platform Synchronised Diving.

Administration
Chef de Mission - Petria Thomas

General Managers - Anna Meares, Sharelle McMahon, Katrina Webb

Chief Operating Officer - Tim Mahon

Medallists

| width="78%" align="left" valign="top" |

| width="22%" align="left" valign="top" |

Competitors
The following table shows which sports/disciplines the 429 Australian athletes were to compete in.

Athletics

32 athletes were selected on 16 May 2022. An additional 53 athletes were selected on 28 June 2022. Four athletes – Joseph Deng, Riley Day, Liz Clay and Ashley Moloney withdrew after selection. On 4 August 2022, Kathryn Mitchell and Stewart McSweyn withdrew due to illness. Alec Diamond  and Mia Gross  replaced Ash Moloney and Riley Day.

 Men
 Track & road events

 Field events

 Combined events – Decathlon

 Women
 Track & road events

 Field events

Combined events – Heptathlon

Badminton

Ten athletes were selected on 31 May 2022. As of 1 June 2022, Australia also qualified for the mixed team event via the BWF World Rankings.

Singles

Doubles

Mixed team

Summary

Squad

Yingxiang Lin
Tran Hoang Pham
Jacob Schueler
Nathan Tang
Jack Yu
Wendy Chen
Kaitlyn Ea
Tiffany Ho
Gronya Somerville
Angela Yu

Group stage

3x3 basketball

Australia qualified to compete in both the men's and women's tournaments, having done so as the highest-ranked nation not already qualified by regional rankings. As of 19 May 2022, they also accepted Bipartite Invitations for both wheelchair tournaments (awarded in lieu of the quotas from the abandoned IWBF Asia/Oceania Qualifiers). Sixteen players were selected on 13 July 2022.

Summary

Men's tournament

Roster
Jesse Wagstaff
Greg Hire
Tom Wright
Daniel Johnson

Group B

Quarter-final

Semi-final

Gold medal match

Women's tournament

Roster
Lauren Scherf
Lauren Mansfield
Marena Whittle
Alex Wilson

Group A

Semi-final

Bronze medal match

Men's wheelchair

Roster
Luke Pople
Lachlin Dalton
Jake Kavanagh
Kurt Thomson

Group B

Semi-final

Gold medal match

Women's wheelchair

Roster
Amber Merritt
Georgia Inglis
Hannah Dodd
Ella Sabljak

Group B

Semi-final

Gold medal match

Beach volleyball

Four players selected on 13 May 2022.

Men's tournament
Group B

Quarter-final

Semi-final

Gold medal match

Women's tournament
Group B

Quarter-final

Semi-final

Gold medal match

Boxing

Eleven boxers were selected on 26 April 2022.

 Men

Women

Cricket

By virtue of its position in the ICC Women's T20I rankings (as of 1 April 2021), Australia qualified for the tournament.

Fixtures were announced in November 2021.

Roster
Fifteen players were selected on 20 May 2022.

Darcie Brown
Nicola Carey
Ashleigh Gardner
Grace Harris
Rachael Haynes
Alyssa Healy
Jess Jonassen
Alana King
Meg Lanning
Tahlia McGrath
Beth Mooney
Ellyse Perry
Megan Schutt
Annabel Sutherland
Amanda-Jade Wellington

Summary

Group stage

Semi-final

Gold medal match

Cycling

34 cyclists were selected on 16 June 2022. Michael Matthews and Kaden Groves withdrew due to trade team commitments and were replaced by Luke Durbridge and Sam Fox in the road race. Caleb Ewan withdrew due to surgery after the 2022 Tour de France.

Road
Men

Women

Track

Sprint

Keirin

Pursuit

Time trial

Points race

Scratch race

Mountain biking

Diving

Fourteen divers – 10 women and 4 men selected on 7 June 2022.

Men

Women

Mixed

Gymnastics

Thirteen gymnasts selected on 20 June 2022.

Artistic
Men
Team Final and Individual Qualification

Individual Finals

Women
Team Final and Individual Qualification

Individual Finals

Rhythmic
Team Final and Individual Qualification

Individual Finals

Hockey

Australia qualified for both tournaments. The men qualified as defending champions, whereas the women qualified based on their position in the FIH Women's World Ranking (as of 1 February 2022).

Detailed fixtures were released on 9 March 2022.

Summary

Men's tournament

Eighteen players selected on 21 June 2022.
Roster

Jacob Anderson
Daniel Beale
Joshua Beltz
Tim Brand
Andrew Charter
Matthew Dawson
Johan Durst
Nathan Ephraums
Blake Govers
Jake Harvie
Jeremy Hayward
Tim Howard
Eddie Ockenden
Flynn Ogilvie
Joshua Simmonds
Jake Whetton
Tom Wickham
Aran Zalewski

Group play

Semi-final

Gold medal match

Women's tournament

Eighteen players selected on 11 June 2022. Brooke Peris and Courtney Schonel withdrew due to injuries and were replaced by Rebecca Greiner and Grace Stewart.
Roster

Jocelyn Bartram
Jane Claxton
Claire Colwill
Madison Fitzpatrick
Rebecca Greiner
Greta Hayes
Stephanie Kershaw
Amy Lawton
Ambrosia Malone
Kaitlin Nobbs
Aleisha Power
Karri Somerville
Penny Squibb
Grace Stewart
Renee Taylor
Shanea Tonkin
Mariah Williams
Georgia Wilson

Group play

Semi-final

Gold medal

Judo

Twelve judokas were selected on 18 May 2022.

Men

Women

Lawn bowls

Eighteen bowlers were selected on 3 June 2022. Grant Fehlberg withdrew due to unforeseen family circumstances and was replaced by Matthew Northcott.

Men

Women

Parasport

Netball

By virtue of its position in the World Netball Rankings (as of 28 July 2021), Australia qualified for the tournament.
Partial fixtures were announced in November 2021, then updated with the remaining qualifiers in March 2022.
Twelve players were selected on 14 June 2022 with three travelling reserves – Donnell Wallam, Jamie-Lee Price, Ruby Bakewell-Doran.
Roster

Sunday Aryang
Kiera Austin
Ash Brazill
Courtney Bruce
Gretel Bueta
Paige Hadley
Sarah Klau
Cara Koenen
Kate Moloney
Liz Watson (c)
Jo Weston
Steph Wood (vc)

Summary

Group stage

Semi-final

Gold medal match

Para powerlifting

Two athletes selected on 15 June 2022.

Rugby sevens

Australia qualified for both the men's and women's tournaments. This was achieved through their positions in the 2018–19 / 2019–20 World Rugby Sevens Series and 2018–19 / 2019–20 World Rugby Women's Sevens Series respectively.

Summary

Men's tournament

Thirteen players players selected on 5 July June 2022.
Roster

Ben Dowling
Matthew Gonzalez
Henry Hutchison
Samu Kerevi
Nathan Lawson
Maurice Longbottom
Nick Malouf
Benn Marr
Mark Nawaqanitawase
Henry Paterson
Dietrich Roache
Corey Toole
Josh Turner

Pool D

Quarter-final

Semi–finals

Bronze medal match

Women's tournament

Thirteen players players selected on 5 July June 2022.
Roster

Charlotte Caslick
Lily Dick
Dominique Du Toit
Demi Hayes
Madison Ashby
Tia Hinds
Alysia Lefau-Fakaosilea
Maddison Levi
Teagan Levi
Faith Nathan
Sariah Paki
Jesse Southwell
Sharni Williams

Pool B

Semi-final

Gold medal

Squash

Eight players – four men and four women selected on 10 June 2022.

Singles

Doubles

Swimming

A squad of twenty-seven para swimmers was selected on 4 May 2022, all having qualified via the World Para Swimming World Rankings for performances registered between 31 December 2020 and 18 April 2022. Forty six able bodied swimmers were selected on 22 May 2022. Three additional Para swimmers selected on 7 July 2022. Two swimmers – Isaac Cooper and Timothy Disken were withdrawn from the team on 19 July 2022.

Athletes listed in events are subject to change up to the close of entries.
Men

Women

Mixed

Table tennis

Team of six athletes was announced on 29 April 2022. Eight athletes select ed on 30 May 2022.

Singles

Doubles

Team

Triathlon

Four vision impaired Para-Triathletes and their guides were announced on 11 May 2022. Six triathletes were selected on 13 June 2022.
Men

Women

Mixed Relay

Weightlifting

A squad of eleven weightlifters (five men, six women) was officially selected on 19 April 2022.

Sarah Cochrane qualified by winning gold at the 2021 Commonwealth Weightlifting Championships in Tashkent, Uzbekistan, whereas the rest of the squad qualified via the IWF Commonwealth Ranking List.

Men

Women

Wrestling

Six wrestlers selected on 1 July 2022.

Facts
 Second largest Australian Commonwealth Games team ever, behind the 473 athletes at the Gold Coast 2018 Games
Jian Fang Lay (table tennis) and Rachael Grinham (squash) became the first female athletes to attend six Commonwealth Games.
Blake Cochrane and Angie Ballard (athletics) became the first Para-sport athletes to represent Australia at four Commonwealth Games.
 Ten indigenous athletes: Taliqua Clancy (beach volleyball), Indiana Cooper (athletics), Ashleigh Gardner (cricket), Maurice Longbottom (rugby 7s), Callum Peters (boxing), Ruby Storm (swimming) Brandon Wakeling (weightlifting), Mariah Williams (hockey), Alex Wilson (3x3 basketball), Alex Winwood (boxing)
 The netball team's win in the final was Australia's 1,000th gold medal in Commonwealth Games history.

See also
Australia at the 2022 Winter Olympics
Australia at the 2022 Winter Paralympics

References

External links
Commonwealth Games Australia Official site
Birmingham 2022 Commonwealth Games Official site

2022
Nations at the 2022 Commonwealth Games
Commonwealth Games